Uranium disulfide is an inorganic chemical compound of uranium in oxidation state +4 and sulfur in oxidation state -2. It is radioactive and appears in the form of black crystals.

Uranium disulfide has two allotropic forms: α-uranium disulfide, which is stable above the transition temperature (about 1350 °C) and metastable below it, and β-uranium disulfide which is stable below this temperature.

References

Uranium(IV) compounds
Sulfides
Dichalcogenides